Attorney General Woods may refer to:

Cyrus Woods (1861–1938), Attorney General of Pennsylvania
Grant Woods (born 1954), Attorney General of Arizona

See also
John Wood (Australian politician) (1829–1914), Attorney General of Victoria
General Woods (disambiguation)